Manoj Tiwari or Manoj Tiwary may refer to:

Manoj Tiwari (film director) (born 1967), Bollywood film director
Manoj Tiwari (politician) (born 1971), Indian politician, singer, and actor who served as an MP for North East Delhi
Manoj Tiwari (Uttarakhand politician), Member of the Uttarakhand Legislative Assembly for Almora Assembly constituency
Manoj Tiwary (cricketer) (born 1985), India and Bengal cricketer; Minister of State for Affairs of Sports and Youth in the West Bengal Assembly